Dorothy Lee may refer to:

 Dorothy Lee (actress) (1911–1999), 1930s actress/comedian
 Dorothy Lee (theologian) (born 1953), Australian New Testament scholar
 Dorothy D. Lee (1905–1975), author and philosopher of cultural anthropology
 Dorothy McCullough Lee (1901–1981), first female mayor of Portland, Oregon
 pseudonym for composer John Stepan Zamecnik